Riccardo Bonadio and Giovanni Fonio were the defending champions but withdrew from the tournament before their quarterfinal match.

Hsu Yu-hsiou and Oleksii Krutykh won the title after defeating Sanjar Fayziev and Markos Kalovelonis 6–1, 7–6(7–5) in the final.

Seeds

Draw

References

External links
 Main draw

Antalya Challenger IV - Doubles